Borapansury is an Indian sub-town in Chawngte subdivision within Lawngtlai district of Mizoram. It covers the Borapansury I and Borapansury II villages of Chakma Autonomous District Council. Borapansury was the first headquarter of Chakma Autonomous District council in 1972.

Villages in Chakma Autonomous District Council